Chul, also spelled Cheol or Chol, is a single-syllable Korean masculine given name, as well as an element in some two-syllable Korean given names. Its meaning differs based on the hanja used to write it.

Hanja
There are 11 hanja with the reading "chul" on the South Korean government's official list of hanja which may be used in given names, as well as variant forms of two of those hanja; they are:

 (쇠 철 soe cheol): "iron"
 (variant of above)
 (밝을 철 balgeul cheol): "bright", "keen"
 (variant of above)
 (통할 철 tonghal cheol): "to penetrate"
 (맑을 철 malgeul cheol): "pure"
 (거둘 철 geodul cheol): "to harvest", "to achieve"
 (바퀴 자국 철 bakwi jaguk cheol): "wheel track"
 (엮을 철 yeokkeul cheol): "to weave"
 (볼록할 철 bollokhal cheol): "convex", "to protrude"
 (그칠 철 geuchil cheol): "to stop"
 (밝을 철 balgeul cheol): "wise"
 (눈 밝을 철 nun balgeul cheol): "sharp eyesight"

People
People with the single-syllable given name Chul include:
Jeong Cheol (1536–1593), Joseon Dynasty statesman and poet
Kim Chol (c. 1960–2012), North Korean politician
Kang Chul (born 1971), South Korean football player
Park Chul (born 1973), South Korean football player
Woo Chul (born 1978), South Korean swimmer
Kim Chul (born 1980), South Korean field hockey player
Hong Chul (born 1990), South Korean football player
Pak Chol (born 1990), North Korean long-distance runner
Lim Cheol (born 1991), stage name DinDin, South Korean rapper
Ahn Chol, North Korean freelance journalist

Fictional characters with the name Chul include:
Kang Cheol, brother of Player 067 (Kang Sae-byeok) in the 2021 South Korean drama Squid Game

As name element
In South Korea, some names ending with this element were popular for baby boys in the 1950s and 1960s, including Sang-chul, Byung-chul, and Young-chul. Other Korean given names containing the element Chul include:

First syllable
Cheol-min
Chul-soo
Chul-soon
Chul-woo

Second syllable
Dong-chul
Hee-chul
Kyu-chul
Min-chul

 
Seung-chul
Sung-chul
Won-chul

See also
List of Korean given names

References

Korean masculine given names